Gantoftadösen (or Jättestugan - "giant's home") is a partially destroyed dolmen in the area of Helsingborg in Scania, Sweden. The dolmen is registered with the RAÄ as Kvistofta 14:1 and was erected between 3500 and 2800 BC by members of the Funnelbeaker culture (TBK; Swedish: Trattbägarkulturen).

The rectangular chamber was about 2.8 m long and 1.4 m wide. Three large support stones hold up a meter thick roof stone of 2.5 x 2.5 m, which is partially split in the middle. On the roof stone (Swedish: takhällen) are nine cup marks, the most common form of Nordish petroglyph.

See also 
 Sliprännor i Gantofta

Bibliography 
 Lars Bägerfeldt: Megalitgravarna i Sverige. Typ, tid, rum och social miljö. 2. Ed., Arkeo Förlaget, Gamleby 1992, .
 Karsten Kjer Michaelsen: Politikens bog om Danmarks oldtid. Politiken, Kopenhagen 2002, S. 253 (= Politikens håndbøger).
 Christopher Tilley: The Dolmens and Passage graves of Sweden: An Introduction and guide. 2009

External links
 Gantoftadösen – Entry in the Fornsök database of the Swedish National Heritage Board (Swedish)

Dolmens
Archaeological sites in Sweden
Funnelbeaker culture
Prehistoric Scandinavia
Helsingborg
Demolished buildings and structures in Sweden